Line 15 of the Shenzhen Metro is a line under planning, which will connect the districts of Bao'an, Nanshan and Qianhai for 32.2 kilometers and 24 stations. Line 15 has entered Phase V planning. Construction is planned to begin in 2023. The line is proposed to use 6 car type A trains.

Stations

References

Shenzhen Metro lines
Transport infrastructure under construction in China